Valery Leonidovich Ilyinykh (7 August 1947 – 3 June 1982) was a Russian gymnast. He competed at the 1968 Summer Olympics in all artistic gymnastics events and won a silver medal in the team competition. Individually his best result was eighth place on the horizontal bar.

References

1947 births
1982 deaths
Soviet male artistic gymnasts
Sportspeople from Novosibirsk
Gymnasts at the 1968 Summer Olympics
Olympic gymnasts of the Soviet Union
Olympic silver medalists for the Soviet Union
Olympic medalists in gymnastics
Medalists at the 1968 Summer Olympics